Nikolett Kovács is a Grand Prix motorcycle racer from Hungary.

Career statistics

By season

Races by year

References

External links
  Profile on motogp.com

Living people
1982 births
Hungarian sportswomen
Hungarian motorcycle racers
125cc World Championship riders
Supersport World Championship riders
Female motorcycle racers
Sportspeople from Budapest